USS Vermont (SSN-792) is a  nuclear powered attack submarine in the United States Navy. She is the 19th boat of the class and the third vessel of the Navy to be named for the U.S. state of Vermont. Then Secretary of the Navy, Ray Mabus, announced her name on 18 September 2014.

Vermont was part of a construction contract, worth  billion, awarded to General Dynamics Electric Boat to build ten Virginia-class submarines, the first of the Block IV type.

On 20 October 2018, Vermont was christened with a bottle of Vermont sparkling apple wine during a ceremony held at the Electric Boat facility in Groton, Connecticut. She was delivered to the Navy on 17 April 2020, and commissioned on 18 April 2020.

Service history
In December 2020, Vermont sailed to Brazil to attend the launch of Brazilian Navy submarine  and perform an exercise with submarine Tupi

References

External links
USS VERMONT Support Group Homepage

 

Virginia-class submarines